Donald Macardle was an Irish film and stage actor and writer. He also directed the 1933 film The King's Cup.

Filmography
Actor
 Wee MacGregor's Sweetheart (1922)
 The Fair Maid of Perth (1923)
 The Loves of Mary, Queen of Scots (1923)
 The Gay Corinthian (1924)
 The Kensington Mystery (1924)
 Nell Gwyn (1926)
 Mumsie (1927)
 The Guns of Loos (1927)
 A Light Woman (1928)
 The Bondman (1928)

Screenwriter
 Carnival (1931)
 Thursday's Child (1943)

Director
 The King's Cup (1933)

References

External links

Year of birth missing
Year of death missing
Irish male film actors
Irish film directors
People from Dundalk